Ray is the seventh album by L'Arc-en-Ciel, released on July 1, 1999, simultaneously with Ark. It reached number two on the Oricon chart, behind only Ark, and sold over two million copies, being certified by the RIAJ.

Track listing

Covers
"Shinshoku ~lose control~" was covered by Fantôme Iris, a fictional visual kei band from multimedia franchise Argonavis from BanG Dream! on their first solo live Fantôme Iris 1st LIVE -C'est la vie!-.

Personnel
 hyde – vocals
 ken – guitar, chromaharp on track 1, keyboards on tracks 2, 7, 8 and 11, tambourine on tracks 3, 5 and 11
 tetsu – bass guitar, backing vocals
 yukihiro – drums, tambourine and shaker on track 2, guitar and keyboards on track 9
 Hajime Okano – keyboards on tracks 1, 2, 4, 5, 7, 8, 10, 11
 Hitoshi Saitou – keyboards on tracks 1, 2, 4, 5, 6, 7, 8, 10, 11
 Shinri Sasaki – piano on track 4
 Sylvie – fills on track 6

References

1999 albums
L'Arc-en-Ciel albums